Elisabeth May Adams Craig (December 19, 1889 in Coosaw Mines, South Carolina – July 15, 1975 in Silver Spring, Maryland) was an American journalist best known for her reports on the Second World War, Korean War and U.S. politics. She was a member of the National American Woman Suffrage Association, and was also a campaigner for equality in children's education.

Although May Craig was a Southerner, she got her break in journalism working for the Maine-based Guy Gannett chain of newspapers (including the Portland Press Herald). She became the company's Washington correspondent, and wrote her Inside Washington column for almost fifty years. She took on leadership roles within both the Women's National Press Club and Eleanor Roosevelt's Press Conference Association, both organisations supporting women in journalism.

During the Second World War, Craig secured a succession of postings to Europe. From this vantage point, she gave eyewitness accounts of the V-bomb attacks on London, the Battle of Normandy and the liberation of Paris. During the war, she constantly battled with the male military commanders and male journalists to have access to the news. One of her best-known quotations is a reference to facilities, the lack of which was often given as reason for not allowing Craig to follow up on the news. She joked that, "Bloody Mary of England once said that when she died they would find Calais graven on her heart" (in reference to a key French outpost lost during Mary's reign); "When I die, there will be the word facilities, so often it has been used to prevent me from doing what men reporters could do." May Craig married Donald A. Craig.

Craig was second in the number of appearances on "Meet the Press" behind David Broder. Craig always wore a hat and gloves on the program, according to her, "so that people would remember who she is."

Transcript  of May Craig at a White-House press conference

This is a transcript of a press conference held by Franklin D. Roosevelt on December 9, 1941, at 4:10 p.m. It was the first American news conference of the war.

MISS MAY CRAIG: You've got a new system out there. (Referring to security at the entrance.)

THE PRESIDENT: What?

MISS MAY CRAIG: A new system out there. It's going to take a long time to get in.

THE PRESIDENT: What's that? What do you have to do? Have they frisked you? (Laughter)

MISS MAY CRAIG: Practically.

THE PRESIDENT: Now May, I don't think that's nice.

MISS MAY CRAIG: They did Fred Hale once.

THE PRESIDENT: I will have to hire a female Secret Service agent around here to do the frisking.

MISS MAY CRAIG: Remember the time they frisked Senator Hale at a reception?

THE PRESIDENT: Terribly funny.

MISS MAY CRAIG: He never got over it.

THE PRESIDENT: He never got over it.

MISS MAY CRAIG: The sacred Hale person.

THE PRESIDENT: He was here before you and I were born. (Pause here as newspapermen continue to file in.)

...

THE PRESIDENT: Well, the only thing I can think of is—on that—you know occasionally I have a few people in to dinner, and generally in the middle of dinner some—I know she isn't—it isn't an individual, it's just a generic term—some "sweet young thing" says, "Mr. President, couldn't you tell us about so and so?"

Well, the other night this "sweet young thing" in the middle of supper said, "Mr. President, couldn't you tell us about the bombing? Where did those planes start from and go to?" And I said, "Yes. I think the time has now come to tell you. They came from our new secret base at Shangri-La!" (Laughter)

And she believed it! (More laughter)

Q: Mr. President, is this the same young lady you talked about -- (Loud laughter interrupted)

THE PRESIDENT: No. This is a generic term. It happens to be a woman.

MISS MAY CRAIG: Is it always feminine? (Laughter)

THE PRESIDENT: What?

MISS MAY CRAIG: Is it always feminine? (Loud Laughter)

THE PRESIDENT: Now May, why did you ask me that?

MISS MAY CRAIG: I wondered.

THE PRESIDENT: I call it a "sweet young thing." Now when I talk about manpower that includes the women, and when I talk about a "sweet young thing," that includes young men. (Again loud laughter)

External References
 Press Conference with Lyndon Johnson, 1965-07-28, appearing at 35:43, asking about presidential authority needed to fight in Vietnam

Sources
 Library of Congress article on May Craig, June 19, 2006
 May Craig on Meet the Press questioning Robert F. Kennedy in the early 1960's.

1889 births
1975 deaths
American women journalists
American women's rights activists
American feminists
American reporters and correspondents
American women civilians in World War II